State of charge (SoC) is the level of charge of an electric battery relative to its capacity. The units of SoC are percentage points (0% = empty; 100% = full). An alternative form of the same measure is the depth of discharge (DoD), the inverse of SoC (100% = empty; 0% = full). SoC is normally used when discussing the current state of a battery in use, while DoD is most often seen when discussing the lifetime of the battery after repeated use.

In electric vehicles 
In a battery electric vehicle (BEV), hybrid vehicle (HV), or plug-in hybrid electric vehicle (PHEV), SoC for the battery pack is the equivalent of a fuel gauge.
It is important to mention that state of charge, presented as a gauge or percentage value on any vehicle dashboard, especially in plug-in hybrid vehicles, may not be representative of a real level of charge. In that particular case, some noticeable amount of energy stored in the electric battery is not shown on the dashboard, and is reserved for hybrid-work operations.  It permits a vehicle to accelerate with electric motors mainly using battery energy, while the petrol engine serves as a generator and recharges the battery to the minimum level needed for such operation. Examples of such cars are Mitsubishi Outlander PHEV (all versions/years of production), where 0% of the state of charge presented to the driver is a real 20-22% of charge level (assuming zero level as the lowest level of charge permitted by car producer). Another one is BMW i3 REX (Range Extender version), where about 6% of SOC is reserved for PHEV-alike operations. Tesla has stated that their SoC should be less than 95%, with some commentators saying between 30%-80% . There is some data to back this up as well.

The state of charge (SOC) can help to reduce electrical car's owners' anxiety when they are waiting in the line or stay at home since it will reflect the progress of charging and let owners know when it will be ready.

Determining SoC 
Usually, SoC cannot be measured directly but it can be estimated from direct measurement variables in two ways: offline and online. In offline techniques, the
battery desires to be charged and discharged in constant rate such as Coulomb-counting. This method gives precise estimation of battery SoC, but they are protracted, costly, and interrupt main battery performance. Therefore, researchers are looking for some online techniques. In general there are five methods to determine SoC indirectly:

 chemical
 voltage
 current integration
 Kalman filtering
 pressure

Chemical method 
This method works only with batteries that offer access to their liquid electrolyte, such as non-sealed lead acid batteries. The specific gravity or pH of the electrolyte can be used to indicate the SoC of the battery.

Hydrometers are used to calculate the specific gravity of a battery. To find specific gravity, it is necessary to measure out volume of the electrolyte and to weigh it. Then specific gravity is given by (mass of electrolyte [g]/ volume of electrolyte [ml])/ (Density of Water, i.e. 1g/1ml). To find SoC from specific gravity, a look-up table of SG vs SoC is needed.

More recently immersion refractometry has been shown to be a viable method for continuous monitoring of the state of charge. The refractive index of the battery electrolyte is directly relatable to the specific gravity or density of the electrolyte of the cell. Sensors, vol.22, no.1, p. 10, January 2005, US patent 10,145,789.

Voltage method 
This method converts a reading of the battery voltage to SoC, using the known discharge curve (voltage vs. SoC) of the battery. However, the voltage is more significantly affected by the battery current (due to the battery's electrochemical kinetics) and temperature. This method can be made more accurate by compensating the voltage reading by a correction term proportional to the battery current, and by using a look-up table of battery's open circuit voltage vs. temperature.

In fact, it is a stated goal of battery design to provide a voltage as constant as possible no matter the SoC, which makes this method difficult to apply.

Current integration method 
This method, also known as "Coulomb counting", calculates the SoC by measuring the battery current and integrating it in time.
Since no measurement can be perfect, this method suffers from long-term drift and lack of a reference point: therefore, the SoC must be re-calibrated on a regular basis, such as by resetting the SoC to 100% when a charger determines that the battery is fully charged (using one of the other methods described here).

Combined approaches 
Maxim Integrated touts a combined voltage and charge approach that is claimed superior to either method alone; it is implemented in their ModelGauge m3 series of chips, such as MAX17050, which is used in the Nexus 6 and Nexus 9 Android devices, for example.

Kalman filtering 
To overcome the shortcomings of the voltage method and the current integration method, a Kalman filter can be used. The battery can be modeled with an electrical model which the Kalman filter will use to predict the over-voltage, due to the current. In combination with coulomb counting, it can make an accurate estimation of the state of charge. The strength of a Kalman filter is that it is able to adjust its trust of the battery voltage and coulomb counting in real time.

Pressure method 
This method can be used with certain NiMH batteries, whose internal pressure increases rapidly when the battery is charged. More commonly, a pressure switch indicates if the battery is fully charged. This method may be improved by taking into account Peukert's law which is a function of charge/discharge current.

See also 
 Battery balancing
 Battery balancer
 Battery charger
 Battery management system (BMS)
 Battery monitoring
 Depth of discharge (DoD)
 State of Health (SoH)

References

Battery charging
Electric vehicle technologies